was one of the leading generals of Oda Nobunaga following the Sengoku period of the 16th century extending to the Azuchi–Momoyama period. His preferred weapon was a yari and he was known as "Yari no Mataza" (槍の又左), Matazaemon (又左衛門) being his common name. He was a member of the so-called Echizen Sanninshu (Echizen Triumvir) along with Sassa Narimasa and Fuwa Mitsuharu. The highest rank from the court that he received is the Great Counselor Dainagon (大納言).

Early life

His father was Maeda Toshimasa and his wife was Maeda Matsu. His childhood name was "Inuchiyo" (犬千代).
Toshiie was born in the village of Arako (present-day Nakagawa-ku, Nagoya), He was the fourth of seven brothers, of Maeda Toshimasa, who held Arako Castle. Toshiie served Oda Nobunaga from childhood (first as a page) and his loyalty was rewarded by being allowed to be the head of the Maeda clan, very unusual for a fourth son with no apparent failures among his elder brothers. Just like Nobunaga, Toshiie was also a delinquent, usually dressed in the outlandish style of a kabukimono, they committed delinquent and deviated behaviors together. It is believed he also became a friend to Kinoshita Tokichiro (later Toyotomi Hideyoshi) in their youth. Just as Hideyoshi was known as Saru, 猴 or "monkey," it is believed that Toshiie was called Inu, 犬 or "dog" by Nobunaga. Due to a long-standing belief that dogs and monkeys are never friendly to each other, Toshiie is often depicted as reserved and stern, in contrast to Hideyoshi's talkative and easy-going nature.

Military life

Toshiie began his career as a member of the akahoro-shū (赤母衣衆), the unit under Oda Nobunaga's personal command. He later became an infantry captain (ashigaru taishō 足軽大将) in the Oda army. During his military career, Toshiie made the acquaintance of many important figures, such as Hashiba Hideyoshi, Sassa Narimasa, Niwa Nagahide, Ikeda Tsuneoki, and others. Toshiie also was a lifelong rival of Tokugawa Ieyasu. After defeating the Asakura clan, Maeda fought under Shibata Katsuie in the Hokuriku area.

In 1554, he took part in the war for the first time in the Battle of Kiyosu Castle which was broken out between Nobunaga and Oda Nobutomo, the Kiyosu Oda clan.

In 1556, he fought in the Battle of Ino against Oda Nobuyuki, younger brother of Nobunaga.

In 1558, he also took part in the Battle of Ukino which was a conflict with Oda Nobukata, a son of Oda Nobuyasu, the Iwakura Oda clan. It is said that it was about the time of this battle that he began to be called by another name like "Yari no Matazaemon" or "Yari no Mataza".

In 1560, he took part in the Battle of Okehazama against Imagawa Yoshimoto. Later he was fought in the 1561 Battle of Moribe, the 1570 Siege of Kanegasaki and Battle of Anegawa, the 1575 Battle of Nagashino, the 1577 Battle of Tedorigawa.

In 1580, He was eventually granted the fief of Fuchu, and a han (Kaga Domain) spanning Noto and Kaga Provinces. Despite its small size, Kaga was a highly productive province which would eventually develop into the wealthiest han in Edo period Japan, with a net worth of 1 million koku (百万石); thus, it was nicknamed Kaga Hyaku-man-goku (加賀百万石).

Toshiie benefited from a core group of very capable senior vassals. Some, like Murai Nagayori and Okumura Nagatomi, were retainers of long standing with the Maeda.

In 1582, after Nobunaga's assassination at Honnō-ji (本能寺) by Akechi Mitsuhide and Mitsuhide's defeat by Hideyoshi, at the subsequent meeting in Kiyosu Castle where the future of the Oda clan was discussed, Toshiie supported Shibata Katsuie's.

In 1583, he battled Hideyoshi under Katsuie's command in the Battle of Shizugatake, but later during the battle, he changed side to Hideyoshi.

In 1584, after Shibata's defeat, Toshiie become leading general for Hideyoshi in Komaki Nagakute Campaign and was forced to fight another of his friends, Sassa Narimasa at the Battle of Suemori Castle. Narimasa was greatly outnumbered and felled by Toshiie.

In 1587, following the major Maeda victory, Toshiie sheltered his fellow daimyo Dom Justo Takayama after Justo was expelled from his position as representative of Christians by the shogun's Bantenren order.

Later in 1590, Toshiie fought in the Odawara Campaign against Later Hōjō clan.

Death

Before dying in 1598, Hideyoshi named Toshiie to the council of Five Elders to support Toyotomi Hideyori until he was old enough to take control on his own.  However, Toshiie himself was ailing, and could manage to support Hideyori for only a year before he died as well in 1599. 
Toshiie was succeeded by his son Toshinaga.

Family

Father: Maeda Toshimasa
Mother: Nagayowai-in (d.1573)
Siblings:
 Maeda Toshihisa (d. 1583)
 Maeda Toshifusa
 Sawaki Yoshiyuki (d. 1572)
Half-Siblings:
 Maeda Yasukatsu (d. 1594)
 Maeda Hidetsugu (d. 1585)
 Maeda Masa (given in marriage to Takabatake Sadayoshi)

Toshiie's wife, Maeda Matsu, was famous in her own right. Strong-willed from childhood, she was well-versed in the martial arts and was instrumental in Toshiie's rise to success. After her husband died, Matsu, then known by her Buddhist nun name of Hoshun-in, assured the safety of the Maeda clan after the year 1600 by voluntarily going as a hostage to Edo, capital of the new shōgun, Tokugawa Ieyasu, whom she loathed throughout her life as she watched him, her husband, and Hideyoshi compete for power.
Wives, concubines, children:
 Wife: Maeda Matsu (1547-1617)
 First Daughter: Kohime (1559–1616) married Maeda Nagatane
 First Son: Maeda Toshinaga (1562-1614)
 Second daughter: Shohime married Nakagawa Mitsushige
 Third daughter: Maahime (1572–1605) become Toyotomi Hideyoshi’s concubine later Madenokoji Atsufusa’s concubine
 Fourth daughter: Gohime (1574–1634) married Ukita Hideie, Toyotomi Hideyoshi's adopted son.
 Fifth Daughter: Yome, Asano Yoshinaga's fiancée
 Second Son: Maeda Toshimasa (1578-1633)
 Seventh Daughter: Chisehime (1580–1641) married Hosokawa Tadataka later married Murai Nagatsugu
 Concubine: Chiyobo (1570-1631) later Kinse-in
 Fourth son: Maeda Toshitsune (1594-1658)
 Concubine: Oiwa, later Ryujo-in
 Sixth daughter: Maeda Kikuhime (1578–1584)
 Ninth daughter: Yoshi, Takeda Nobuyoshi's fiancée, later married Shinohara Sadahide
 3 boys (early life)
 Concubine: Ozai, later Kinse-in
 Eighth daughter: Fuku, married Cho Yoshitsura, later married Nakagawa Mitsutada
 Third son: Maeda Tomoyoshi (1591-1628)
 Concubine: Jufuku-in
 Fifth son: Maeda Toshitaka (1594–1637)
 Concubine: Kaishoin
 Sixth son: Maeda Toshisada (1598-1620)
 unknown
 girl (early life)
 Nephew: Maeda Toshimasu (1543-1612)
Their sons all became daimyōs in their own right. Their daughters married into prestigious families; the eldest, Kō, married Maeda Nagatane, a distant relative of Toshiie who became a senior Kaga retainer; Ma'a, was a concubine of Toyotomi Hideyoshi later Married Marikouji Mitsurubo, Gō was adopted by Hideyoshi and became the wife of Ukita Hideie, and Chise, who was first wedded to Hosokawa Tadaoki's son Tadataka, later married Murai Nagayori's son Nagatsugu. Sho married Nakagawa Mitsushige. Toshi married Shinohara Sadahide. Fuku married Nakagawa Mitsutada.

Ōdenta sword
"Ōdenta" or "Great Denta" or "The Best among Swords Forged by Denta". Along with "Onimaru" and "Futatsu-mei", the sword was considered to be one of the three regalia swords of the shoguns of the Ashikaga clan. Later passed down to Maeda Toshiie. A legend says the sword healed a daughter of Toshiie and another legend says birds never try to approach to a warehouse where this sword is stored.

In popular culture
He is a playable character in video game Sengoku Basara 2 (PS2) and an unplayable character in video game Sengoku Basara 4 (PS3). He wields a large Nodachi and fire-based attacks. In anime, they were initially servants of Oda Nobunaga, later turned to Toyotomi Hideyoshi.
He is a playable character in the video game "Samurai warriors 2 Extreme legends" (PS2) and appears in every major samurai warriors title following his first appearance . He wields a single sword and twin spears.

Honours
Junior First Rank (24 March 1599; posthumously)

See also
 Battle of Nagashino
 People of the Sengoku period in popular culture

Further reading
Hanagasaki Moriaki 花ケ前盛明, ed. Maeda Toshiie no Subete 前田利家のすべて. Tokyo: Shin Jinbutsu Ōraisha 新人物往来社, 2001.
Iwasawa Yoshihiko 岩沢愿彥. Maeda Toshiie 前田利家. Tokyo: Yoshikawa Kōbunkan 吉川弘文館, 1966.
Kitamura Saburō 北村三郎. Maeda Toshiie monogatari: Kaga hyakumangoku no so 前田利家物語:加賀百万石の祖. Kanazawa: Hokkoku Shuppansha 北国出版社, 1978.
Maeda Toshiyasu 前田利祐. Omatsu to Toshiie: Kaga hyakumangoku wo tsukutta hitobito おまつと利家:加賀百万石を創った人びと. Tokyo: Shūeisha 集英社, 2001.
Tsumoto Yō 津本陽. Maeda Toshiie 前田利家. Tokyo: Kōdansha 講談社, 1994.

References

External links
Buke-kaden page on the Maeda clan (in Japanese)
Maeda Genealogy (in Japanese)
Genealogy of Kanazawa-han daimyo, including Toshiie (in Japanese)
Biography (in Japanese)

1539 births
1599 deaths
Daimyo
Tairō
Maeda clan
Japanese pages
People from Nagoya
Oda retainers
Toyotomi retainers
Deified Japanese people